The 2022 FIM JuniorGP World Championship is the eleventh season of former CEV Moto3 and the ninth edition under the FIM.

The championship had a name change enhancing JuniorGP leaving the historical connection to CEV. The season starts in 8 May at Estoril Circuit, Portugal.

Calendar 
The calendar was published in November 2021. The Jerez and second Valencia rounds were advanced to July and October.

Entry List

Riders' Championship standings 
Points were awarded to the top fifteen riders, provided the rider finished the race.